Siah Chub Kalay  is a village in Zabul Province, in southern Afghanistan, roughly 100 miles northeast of Kandahar. It was the site of a battle of the Operation Enduring Freedom between the Taliban and the coalition forces in early June 2004 after a convoy was ambushed. During eight days of intense fighting, more than 80 Taliban fighters were killed and eight Marines wounded.

References

Populated places in Zabul Province